Jean-Christophe Lamberti (born January 16, 1982 in Bastia) is a French former professional footballer who played as a midfielder.

He played on the professional level in Ligue 1 for SC Bastia.

External links
 
 
 

1982 births
Living people
French footballers
Ligue 1 players
SC Bastia players
Gazélec Ajaccio players
CA Bastia players
Association football midfielders
Footballers from Corsica